John Brian James (24 October 1948 – February 2021) was an English footballer who played as a striker. He played in the English Football League for Port Vale, Chester and Tranmere Rovers, making 381 appearances in the process, and also played in the North American Soccer League for the Chicago Sting. He won promotions out of the Fourth Division with Port Vale, Chester and Tranmere.

Career

Port Vale
James began his career in his native Staffordshire with Port Vale, turning professional in April 1966. He made his senior debut on 12 April 1966, in a 3–0 win over Newport County at Vale Park. He would help the youth-team to reach the quarter-finals of the FA Youth Cup in 1966–67. Initially a defender, manager Gordon Lee converted him into a striker. He became a first-team regular from September 1967 and went on to make more than 200 league appearances for Vale, including 43 in the club's promotion season from the Fourth Division in 1969–70. His goals were crucial to the club, top scorer in both 1969–70 and 1970–71 with 17 and 15 goals respectively. He missed much of the 1971–72 campaign due to a cartilage injury requiring two separate operations. After returning to the squad in February 1972 he was much less effective and lost his first team spot.

Chester
In February 1973, James moved to Chester for £5,000, playing his first game alongside fellow home debutant Reg Matthewson in a 5–0 win over Darlington, that saw James amongst the scorers. The following season saw James net 21 league goals, the highest tally by a Chester player since Gary Talbot in 1968–69, but his most memorable campaign would follow in 1974–75.

James struck 13 times as Chester won promotion from the Fourth Division, but he was to enjoy national fame thanks to his goalscoring exploits in the League Cup during the same season. After wins over Walsall, Blackpool and Preston North End, Chester were drawn at home to First Division champions Leeds United. On a momentous night, Chester recorded a shock 3–0 win, with James scoring twice. He followed it up by scoring the winning goal in the quarter-finals against another top-flight side, Newcastle United, to set up a semi–final tie with Aston Villa. James found the net in the second leg to level the aggregate score at 4–4, only for Brian Little to grab a late Villa winner and break Chester's hearts.

Tranmere Rovers
Despite his contribution to Chester's success, James played just two first–team games for Chester after promotion and joined neighbours Tranmere Rovers in part-exchange for Paul Crossley in September 1975. Once more promotion from the Fourth Division was enjoyed, with James netting 19 times in 38 league games. After a spell playing for Chicago Sting in the North American Soccer League, he returned to Prenton Park and remained at the club before joining non–league Stafford Rangers in 1978.

Style of play
Speaking in 2016, a Port Vale supporter who remembered seeing James play compared him to a Duracell battery due to his high stamina levels. Fans nicknamed him "Jesse" after the famous outlaw Jesse James.

Later life
James later moved to Torquay to run a newsagents with his wife. 

He died in February 2021, aged 72, following battles with cancer and Alzheimer's disease, leaving his wife of 53 years, Tricia.

Career statistics

Honours
Port Vale
Football League Fourth Division promotion (4th place): 1969–70

Chester
Football League Fourth Division promotion (4th place): 1974–75

Tranmere Rovers
Football League Fourth Division promotion (4th place): 1975–76

References

1948 births
2021 deaths
People from Stone, Staffordshire
English footballers
English expatriate footballers
Association football forwards
Port Vale F.C. players
Chester City F.C. players
Tranmere Rovers F.C. players
Chicago Sting (NASL) players
Stafford Rangers F.C. players
English Football League players
North American Soccer League (1968–1984) players
Northern Premier League players
English expatriate sportspeople in the United States
Expatriate soccer players in the United States
Deaths from cancer in England
Deaths from dementia in England
Deaths from Alzheimer's disease
Place of death missing